Ernest Ačkun (Ернест Ачкун) (March 27, 1930 – September 28, 2001) was a Yugoslav clarinetist.

Early life
Ernest Ačkun was born in Hrastnik, Slovenia, which was then part of the Kingdom of Yugoslavia.

He completed his studies at the Belgrade Academy of Music under Bruno Brun, and then studied at the Paris Conservatory under Ulysse Delécluse.

Performance and teaching activities

Ačkun gave concerts as a soloist in nearly all great towns in Yugoslavia, as well as in France, West Germany, Austria, Italy and Bulgaria, playing under the leadership of such conductors as Zubin Mehta, Jean Martinon, Charles Bruck, Krešimir Baranović, Oskar Danon, Milan Horvat, Živojin Zdravković.

Distinguished Yugoslav composers, such as Stjepan Šulek and Zlatan Vauda, dedicated their compositions to him. He also recorded for radio and television.

Ačkun was principal clarinetist of the Belgrade Philharmonic Orchestra and Professor of Chamber Music at the Faculty of Music in Belgrade.

Awards and honors

He won several important prizes, including the First Prize at the Competition of Yugoslav Performing Artists in Skopje and was a prize winner in the ARD International Music Competition  (both 1954). He was also rewarded the UMUS award for the best music performance achievement in the previous concert season (1984).

He was a jury member on various competitions, including the 1987 Jeunesses Musicales International Competition in Belgrade, along with James Campbell (Canada), Walter Boeykens (Belgium), John McCaw (UK), Ludwig Kurkiewicz (Poland), Vyacheslav Ovchinnikov (U.S.S.R.), Milenko Stefanovic (Yugoslavia), Marko Rudzak (Yugoslavia) and Stjepan Rabuzin (Yugoslavia).

In 1992 he was a jury member on the ARD International Music Competition in Munich, along with Eugene Rousseau (United States), Eduard Brunner (Switzerland), Philippe Cuper (France), Giora Feidman (Argentina), Lutz Kŏhler (Germany), Lew Mikhailow (U.S.S.R.), Charles Neidich (U.S.A.) and Ulf Rodenhäuser (Germany).

Affiliations
Ačkun was a member and president of the Association of Musical Artists of Serbia.

Later life
Ernest Ačkun died in Belgrade, Serbia, which was then part of FR Yugoslavia.

External links
A record by Ernest Ačkun
Zlatan Vauda: Clarinet Concerto, performed by Ernest Ačkun

References
Barker, John Craig: The Jeunesses Musicales Belgrade International Competition, The Clarinet, February/March 1988
Blagojevic, Andrija. "Bruno Brun (1910-1978) - Founder of the Yugoslav clarinet school."  The Clarinet, Vol. 41/3 (June 2014), pp. 46–51.
 Blagojević, Andrija. "The Performance Career of Bruno Brun."  The Clarinet, Vol. 47/3 (June 2020), pp. 34–37.
Dizon, Kristine. "Croatian Clarinet Concertos." Clarinet & Saxophone, Vol. 43, No. 1 (Spring 2018), pp. 22-25.
Eberst, A. [1963] : Klarinet i klarinetisti, Forum, Novi Sad
Gillespie, James: The International Clarinet Competition of the ARD-Munich, The Clarinet, September 2003
Jugokoncert: 1946-1971, ed. by Milena Milanović.  Belgrade: Yugoslav concert agency, 1971.
Lawson, C. J. (1995), The Cambridge Companion to the Clarinet, Cambridge University Press
LP 2130556 STEREO, Produkcija gramofonskih ploča Radio-televizije Beograd, Beograd
Maksimović, M. (1971): Beogradska filharmonija 1951-1971, Beogradska filharmonija, Beograd
Muzička enciklopedija, I (1971), Jugoslovenski leksikografski zavod, Zagreb
Muzika i muzičari u NOB - Zbornik sećanja (1982), Grupa izdavača, Beograd
Pedeset godina Fakulteta muzičke umetnosti (Muzičke akademije) 1937-1987 (1988), Univerzitet umetnosti u Beogradu, Beograd
Pejović, R. (1986): Oskar Danon, Univerzitet umetnosti u Beogradu, Beograd
Peričić, V. [1969]: Muzički stvaraoci u Srbiji, Prosveta, Beograd
Stojković, Milica. Bila sam svedok: Muzička produkcija RTB 1976-1992. Beograd: RDU Radio-televizija Srbije, 2011.
Svet Plus, 28 September 2009
Vremeplov RTS-a, 28 September 2009
Walzel, Robert: The Belgrade Competition - A First Hand Account, The Clarinet, February/March 1988

1930 births
2001 deaths
Serbian classical clarinetists
Slovenian musicians
Yugoslav musicians
Academic staff of the University of Arts in Belgrade
University of Arts in Belgrade alumni
Slovenian clarinetists
20th-century classical musicians
20th-century clarinetists
People from Hrastnik